The Mafia Stole My Guitar is the second album by Alex Harvey. The earlier Alex Harvey Presents: The Loch Ness Monster was made while the rest of The Sensational Alex Harvey Band were recording Fourplay. The Mafia Stole My Guitar was the last album Harvey released during his lifetime; he died in 1982.

Critical reception
AllMusic called the album "the same unusual but intriguing blend of prog ambition and punk energy." The Canberra Times described The New Band as "a competent crew of old style blues-jazz orientated rock musicians" and suggested elements of the album were reminiscent of Colosseum and The Soft Machine.

Track listing
"Don's Delight" (Don Weller)
"Back in The Depot" (Alex Harvey, Matthew Cang)
"Wait For Me Mama" (Alex Harvey, Don Weller, Matthew Cang, Hugh McKenna)
"The Mafia Stole My Guitar" (Alex Harvey)
"Shakin' All Over" (Johnny Kidd)
"The Whalers (Thar She Blows)" (Alex Harvey, Matthew Cang, Hugh McKenna)
"Oh Spartacus!" (Alex Harvey, Matthew Cang)
"Just a Gigolo/I Ain't Got Nobody" (Irving Caesar, Julius Brammer/Leonello Casucci)

Personnel
Alex Harvey - lead vocals, lead guitar
The New Band
Matthew Cang - lead guitar, keyboards, vocals
Simon Charterton - drums, percussion, vocals
Tommy Eyre - keyboards (main), vocals
Gordon Sellar - bass guitar, vocals
Don Weller - saxophone, horns on "Oh Spartacus!"
Technical
Mike Hedges - engineer
Mark Freegard - assistant engineer

References

1979 albums
Alex Harvey (musician) albums
RCA Records albums
Albums recorded at Morgan Sound Studios